Minor league baseball teams were based in Lafayette, Indiana in various seasons between 1909 and 1994. Lafayette teams played as members of the Northern State of Indiana League from 1909 to 1911, the Mississippi–Ohio Valley League in 1955, the Midwest League in 1956 and 1957 and 1994 Great Central League, winning two league championships. Lafayette was a minor league affiliate of the Cleveland Indians in 1955 and Boston Red Sox in 1956 and 1957.

History
Lafayette, Indiana first hosted minor league baseball with the 1909 Lafayette Maroons. The Lafayette Maroons were members of the six–team Class D level Northern State of Indiana League. The Maroons finished as co–league champions in their first season. The Bluffton Babes, Huntington Johnnies, Kokomo Wild Cats, Marion Boosters and Wabash Whitecaps joined Lafayette in league play. The Maroons finished the 1909 season with a record of 66–39, playing under manager Pete Driver. The Bluffton Babes with a 65–38 (.631) record and the Lafayette Maroons with a 66–39 record (.629) tied for 1st place in the standing, as no playoffs were held. The teams finished 6.0 games ahead of the 3rd place Huntington Johnnies in the final standings.

Continuing play in 1910, the Lafayette Farmers placed 3rd in the Northern State of Indiana League final standings after the league realigned during the season. The Farmers finished the season with a 39–30 record under managers Fred Payne and Carl Cominger. In 1910, the Northern State of Indiana League began the season with four teams. On July 2, 1910, the Bluffton Babes and Marion Booster franchises joined league play and games played prior to July 1, 1910, were not counted in the standings. The Wabash Rockeries won the league championship with a 46–25 record, finishing 3.5 games ahead of the 2nd place Bluffton Babes and 6.0 games ahead of the 3rd place Lafayette Farmers.

The Lafayette Farmers continued play in 1911, as the Northern State of Indiana League folded during the season. Lafayette was in 4th place when the 1911 Northern State of Indiana League folded during the season. On July 29, 1911, the Farmers had a record of 28–37 under Carl Cominger when the league permanently folded. Lafayette finished 13.0 games behind the Marion Boosters in the final standings.

Minor league play returned to Lafayette, Indiana in 1955. The 1955 the Lafayette Chiefs began play in the Mississippi–Ohio Valley League as an affiliate of the Cleveland Indians. The Lafayette Chiefs became members of the eight–team Class D level Mississippi–Ohio Valley League, with the Clinton Pirates, Decatur Commodores, Dubuque Packers, Hannibal Citizens, Kokomo Giants, Mattoon Indians and Paris Lakers joining Lafayette in league play. The Lafayette Chiefs finished with a 63–63 record, ending the season in 5th place under manager Mark Wylie, finishing 11.0 games behind the 1st place Dubuque Packers. Lafayette had home attendance of 61,287 fans for the season.

In 1956, Lafayette became an affiliate of the Boston Red Sox, adopting the corresponding Lafayette Red Sox moniker. The franchise remained a member as the Mississippi–Ohio Valley League League changed the league name to the Midwest League, which continued as a Class D level league. The Clinton Pirates, Decatur Commodores, Dubuque Packers, Kokomo Dodgers, Mattoon Phillies, Michigan City White Caps and Paris Lakers were the other Midwest League charter members. The Lafayette Red Sox placed 2nd in the Midwest League with a 69–56 record, playing under manager Len Okrie. In the playoffs, the Red Sox were defeated in the 1st round of the four–team playoff by the eventual champion Paris Lakers 2 games to 0. Lafayette had total season attendance of 42,821.

In their final season of play, the 1957 Lafayette Red Sox missed the Midwest League playoffs. Lafayette ended the season with a 55–67 record, under manager Ken Deal, placing 6th in the final standings and finishing 19.0 games behind the 1st place Kokomo Dodgers. The franchise drew 32,667 at home for the season.

After the 1957 season, the Lafayette franchise moved to Waterloo, Iowa and became the Waterloo Hawks, playing in the 1958 Midwest League. The franchise is still in play and evolved into today's Lansing Lugnuts.

Lafayette, Indiana was without minor league baseball until the 1994 Lafayette Leopards played as members of the Independent level Great Central League which folded during the 1994 season. Lafayette was in 1st place with a 44–24 record when the league folded.

The ballpark
Starting in 1955, Lafayette teams reportedly played minor league home games at Loeb Stadium. The ballpark was known as "Colombian Park" until 1971. Built in 1937, the ballpark had a capacity of 5,000 in 1955 and 3,200 in 1997, with dimensions (Left, Center, Right) of 322–415–333. The stadium was demolished in 2019, with a new ballpark opening on the site in 2021.

From 1943 to 1945, Colombian Park was the Spring Training site of the Cleveland Indians. In this era, teams held spring training at cities in their region because of restrictions in place due to World War II.

Timeline

Year–by–year records

Notable alumni

Ken Deal (1957, MGR)
Russ Gibson (1957)
Carl Mathias (1955)
Len Okrie (1957, MGR)
Fred Payne (1910, MGR)
Jay Ritchie (1956)
Tracy Stallard (1956–1957) Surrendered Roger Maris' #61 Home Run, 1961

See also
Lafayette Red Sox players

References

External links
Baseball Reference

Lafayette metropolitan area, Indiana
Tippecanoe County, Indiana